Line 5 is a line of the Xi'an Metro. The line is colored yellow-green on maps.

History

Opening timeline

While Phase 1 includes section from Epanggongnan to Xi'andongzhan, and Phase 2 includes Chuangxingang to Epanggongnan, both phase sections (except the three easternmost stations) are opened together on 28 December 2020.

Stations

References 

05
Railway lines opened in 2020
2020 establishments in China